, better known by the stage name , is a Japanese voice actress from the Tokyo Metropolis area. She is employed by 81 Produce. Her best-known roles are Otose in Gin Tama and Orochimaru in Naruto. She also voices Sakura Ogami in Danganronpa and the Scooter Lady in the You're Under Arrest series.

Filmography

Anime

Video games

Overseas dubbing

Notes

References

External links
 Official agency profile 
 

1960 births
81 Produce voice actors
Japanese voice actresses
Living people
Voice actresses from Tokyo Metropolis